The inauguration of James K. Polk as the 11th president of the United States took place on Tuesday, March 4, 1845, at the East Portico of the United States Capitol in Washington, D.C. This was the 15th inauguration and marked the commencement of the only four-year term of both James K. Polk as president and George M. Dallas as vice president. Polk was sworn in by Chief Justice Roger B. Taney. This was the first inaugural ceremony to be reported by telegraph and to be shown in a newspaper illustration; it appeared in The Illustrated London News.

See also
Presidency of James K. Polk
1844 United States presidential election

References

External links

More documents from the Library of Congress
Text of Polk's Inaugural Address

United States presidential inaugurations
Presidency of James K. Polk
1845 in American politics
1845 in Washington, D.C.
March 1845 events